Taking Sides (German title Taking Sides - Der Fall Furtwängler) is a 2001 German-French-Austrian-British biographical drama film directed by István Szabó and starring Harvey Keitel and Stellan Skarsgård. The story is set during the period of denazification investigations conducted in post-war Germany after the Second World War, and it is based on the real interrogations that took place between a U.S. Army investigator and the musical conductor Wilhelm Furtwängler, who had been charged with serving the Nazi regime. It is based on the 1995 play of the same title by Ronald Harwood.

The film was shot on location in Germany with the dialogue in German and English, although in the version released in the US and the UK the dialogue is only in English.

Plot 
In Berlin at the end of World War II, Wilhelm Furtwängler (Stellan Skarsgård) is conducting Beethoven's 5th Symphony when yet another Allied air raid stops the performance. A minister in the Nazi government comes to Furtwängler's dressing room to advise him that he should go abroad, and escape the war. The film then jumps to some time after the Allied victory. U.S. Army General Wallace (R. Lee Ermey) tasks Major Steve Arnold (Harvey Keitel) with "getting" Furtwängler at his denazification hearing: "Find Wilhelm Furtwängler guilty. He represents everything that was rotten in Germany".

Arnold gets an office with Lt. David Wills (Moritz Bleibtreu), a German-American Jew, and Emmaline Straube (Birgit Minichmayr), daughter of an executed member of the German resistance. Arnold questions several musicians, many of whom know Emmaline's father and say that Furtwängler refused to give Hitler the Nazi salute.

Arnold begins interrogating Furtwängler, asking why he didn't leave Germany in 1933 like so many other musicians. Why he had played for Hitler's birthday? Why he had played at a Nazi rally? And why his recording of Anton Bruckner's 7th Symphony was used on the radio after Hitler's death? Arnold gets a second violinist to tell him about Furtwängler's womanizing and the conductor's professional jealousy of Herbert von Karajan.

In a subplot, Arnold is assisted by a young Jewish U.S. Army lieutenant. The young officer begins to have sympathy for the conductor, as does the young German woman who works as a clerk in their office. This causes friction between Arnold and his subordinates.

In a voice-over, Arnold explains that Furtwängler was exonerated at the later hearings but boasts that his questioning "winged" him. Actual footage of the real Furtwängler shows him shaking hands with Propaganda Minister Joseph Goebbels after a concert. The conductor surreptitiously wipes his hands with a cloth after touching the Nazi.

Cast 
Harvey Keitel as Major Steve Arnold
In the same year (2001) Keitel played an opposite role as SS-Oberscharführer Erich Muhsfeldt in the film The Grey Zone.

Stellan Skarsgård as Wilhelm Furtwängler
Moritz Bleibtreu 	as Lieutenant David Wills
Birgit Minichmayr as Emmi Straube
Ulrich Tukur as Helmut Alfred Rode, 2nd violinist
Oleg Tabakov as Colonel Dymshitz
Hanns Zischler as Rudolf Otto Werner, oboist
Armin Rohde as Schlee, timpanist
R. Lee Ermey as General Wallace
August Zirner as Captain Ed Martin
Daniel White as Sergeant Adams
Thomas Thieme as Reichsminister
Franck Leboeuf as French aide

Historical basis 
Even though many prominent contemporary German artists left, Furtwängler did not leave Germany in 1933 after Adolf Hitler took power. He played at numerous concerts attended by Nazi officials. A recording of the Adagio of Bruckner's Seventh Symphony was even played after the announcement of the death of Hitler. In 1945, he eventually went to Switzerland  after playing a concert in Vienna. These facts, compounded by circumstances of the denazification hearings, caused Furtwängler's case to be significantly delayed.

Furtwängler was specifically charged with supporting Nazism by remaining in Germany, performing at Nazi party functions and with making an anti-Semitic remark against the part-Jewish conductor Victor de Sabata. He was eventually cleared on all these counts.

To the criticism of both movie critics and American audiences of depicting the American Denazification officer Maj. Steve Arnolds (Harvey Keitel) as a "caricature, a bully, a Philistine", screenplay writer Ronald Harwood told The Jewish Journal that he went on to comb archives for denazification transcripts and to interview officials who had supervised such proceedings."They were morally brutal," Hardwood stated. "They bullied people, and they did behave in an extreme way. But they had just seen the camps, and no one in the world had seen that before.".

Reception 
Roger Ebert found the film "both interesting and unsatisfying. The Keitel performance is over the top, inviting us to side with Furtwängler simply because his interrogator is so vile. There are maddening lapses, as when Furtwängler's rescue of Jewish musicians is mentioned but never really made clear. But Skarsgård's performance is poignant; it has a kind of exhausted passivity, suggesting a man who once stood astride the world and now counts himself lucky to be insulted by the likes of Major Arnold."

Mick LaSalle of the San Francisco Chronicle finds that the film's promise to provide a balanced argument "goes unrealized, and all we're left with is the spectacle of an idiot bullying a genius. Harvey Keitel's performance as the smug, self-satisfied major is terribly miscalculated, unless he intended for us to loathe the spectacle of a small, stupid man glorying in his sudden power. That's possible. Stellan Skarsgård plays Furtwängler with an air of exhaustion that seems a generous attempt to justify the script's weakness, that the conductor doesn't defend himself vigorously enough. Of the two men, it's the major who acts more like a Nazi."

References

External links 
 
 Movie home page

2001 films
2000s historical drama films
2001 biographical drama films
Babelsberg Studio films
English-language Austrian films
English-language French films
English-language German films
2000s English-language films
2000s German-language films
Films set in Germany
Films set in Berlin
Films set in 1946
Films shot in Germany
Films about classical music and musicians
Films directed by István Szabó
German historical drama films
German biographical drama films
Austrian historical drama films
Austrian biographical drama films
French historical drama films
French biographical drama films
British historical drama films
British biographical drama films
British films based on plays
German films based on plays
French films based on plays
Austrian films based on plays
Films with screenplays by Ronald Harwood
2001 drama films
2000s British films
2000s French films
2000s German films